Admiral (abbreviated as ADML) is the highest active rank of the Royal Australian Navy and was created as a direct equivalent of the British naval rank of admiral. It is a four-star rank. Since 1968, generally the only time the rank is held is when the Chief of the Defence Force is a navy officer.

Admiral is a higher rank than vice admiral, but is a lower rank than admiral of the fleet. Admiral is the equivalent of air chief marshal in the Royal Australian Air Force and general in the Australian Army.

Australian admirals
The following have held the rank of admiral in the Royal Australian Navy:

Rank insignia and personal flag

The current ranks are rear admiral, vice admiral, admiral and admiral of the fleet, also known as flag ranks because admirals, known as flag officers, are entitled to fly a personal flag. An admiral of the fleet flies a national flag at the masthead, while an admiral flies a St George's cross (red cross on white). Vice admirals and rear admirals fly a St George's cross with one or two red discs in the hoist, respectively. These command flags are exactly the same as in the Royal Navy, except for the admiral of the fleet, who flies the Union Flag.

The rank of admiral itself is shown in its sleeve lace by a broad band with three narrower bands. Since the mid-1990s, the insignia of a Royal Australian Navy admiral is the Crown of St. Edward above a crossed sword and baton, above four silver stars, above the word AUSTRALIA.  Note that unlike other Commonwealth countries, the sword is a naval cutlass, with a  closed handle. The stars have eight points, like the Royal Navy insignia and unlike the four-pointed Order of the Bath stars used by the army.

Prior to 1995, the RAN shoulder board was identical to the UK shoulder board. The UK shoulder board changed in 2001.

See also
Ranks of the Royal Australian Navy
Australian Defence Force ranks and insignia

Notes

References

Military ranks of Australia
Royal Australian Navy
Australia